Gorytvesica derelicta is a species of moth of the family Tortricidae. It is endemic to Ecuador (Loja Province).

Adults are sexually dimorphic. The species is easily distinguished by the white, dark edged hindwings in females.

References

External links

Moths described in 2002
Endemic fauna of Ecuador
Euliini
Moths of South America
Taxa named by Józef Razowski